Bastable may refer to:

Characters
 The Bastables, characters in the 1899 novel The Story of the Treasure Seekers and its sequels by E. Nesbit
 Ornery Bastable, a character in the 1998 novel Six Moon Dance by American writer Sheri S. Tepper
 Oswald Bastable, a character in stories by British writer Michael Moorcock

People
 Charles Francis Bastable (fl. 1882–1932), Irish economist and Whately Chair of Political Economy, Trinity College, Dublin, Ireland
 Steve Bastable (born 1956), British speedway rider
 Tony Bastable (1944–2007), British television presenter

Places 

 Bastable Theatre, theatre in Syracuse, New York

See also
 Barnstable (disambiguation)
 Barstable (disambiguation)